Comings may refer to:

 David Comings (born 1935), American geneticist
 George Comings (1848-1942), American politician
 Lydia J. Newcomb Comings (1850–1946), American educator, lecturer, author
 William Comings White (1890-1965), American scientist